The following Baptist State or Territory Conventions have registered voluntarily with the National Baptist Convention, USA. The State Conventions are autonomous organizations and separately incorporated. Each State Convention is supported by the voluntary membership of individuals, churches and district associations in the state.

Mid-West Region Conference

Illinois
 Baptist General State Convention of Illinois, Inc.
 United Baptist State Convention of Illinois, Inc.

Indiana
 General Missionary Baptist State Convention of Indiana, Inc.
 The Original General Missionary Baptist State Convention of Indiana, Inc.

Iowa

 Iowa Missionary & Education Baptist State Convention

Michigan

 Wolverine Baptist State Convention, Inc.
 Baptist Missionary & Education State Convention

Minnesota

 Minnesota Baptist State Convention

Missouri

 Missionary Baptist State Convention of Missouri

Ohio
Ohio Baptist State Convention, Inc.

Ohio Baptist General Convention and Auxiliaries, Inc.

United Missionary Baptist State Convention of Ohio

West Virginia

 West Virginia Baptist State Convention
 Mountain Baptist State Convention of West Virginia, Inc.

Wisconsin

 Wisconsin General Baptist State Convention, Inc.
 General Baptist State Convention of Wisconsin, Inc.

Northeast Region Conference

Connecticut

 Connecticut State Missionary Baptist Convention

Delaware

 United Baptist Convention of Delaware

District Of Columbia

 National Capital Baptist Convention
 Baptist Convention of the District of Columbia and Vicinity

Maryland

 National Capital Baptist Convention
 United Baptist Missionary Convention

New Jersey

 General Baptist Convention of New Jersey

New Hampshire

 United Baptist Convention MA/RI/NH

New York

 Empire Baptist Missionary Convention of New York

Massachusetts

 United Baptist Convention MA/RI/NH

Pennsylvania

 The Pennsylvania Baptist State Convention, Inc.

Rhode Island

 United Baptist Convention MA/RI/NH

Southeast Region Conference

Florida

 Florida General Baptist Convention, Inc.
 General Baptist State Convention of Florida, Inc.

Georgia

 The General Missionary Baptist Convention of Georgia

 Fellowship Missionary Baptist Convention of Georgia

North Carolina

 General Baptist State Convention of North Carolina

South Carolina

 The Baptist Education & Missionary Convention of South Carolina

Virginia

 Baptist General Convention of Virginia
 Virginia State Baptist Convention

Southwest Region Conference

Alabama

 The Alabama State Missionary Baptist Convention, Inc.
 New Era Baptist Convention of Alabama

Arkansas

 Consolidated Missionary Baptist State Convention of Arkansas, Inc.
 Regular Arkansas Baptist Convention

Kentucky

 Bluegrass State Baptist Convention
 Kentucky Baptist Missionary & Education Convention

Louisiana

 Greater Louisiana Baptist Convention, Inc.
 Louisiana Missionary Baptist State Convention

Mississippi

 East Mississippi State Baptist Convention
 General Missionary Baptist State Convention of Mississippi, Inc.
 Mid-South Churches Cooperative Conference (Baptist) State Convention
 Mississippi General Missionary Baptist State Convention
 New Educational State Convention of Mississippi
 North Mississippi Baptist Education Convention
 Northeast Mississippi Baptist State Convention

Tennessee

 North Mississippi Baptist Education Convention
 Tennessee Regular Baptist Missionary & Educational State Convention
 Tennessee Baptist Missionary & Educational Convention, Inc.

Texas

 Baptist Missionary and Education Convention of Texas
 Texas Educational Baptist State Convention
 Texas State Missionary Baptist Convention, Inc.

Western Region Conference

Alaska

 American/National Baptist Churches of Alaska.

Arizona

 Paradise Missionary Baptist State Convention of Arizona, Inc.

California

 Western Baptist State Convention
 California State Baptist Convention, Inc.
 Nevada-California Interstate Baptist Convention
 California Bible Convention

Colorado

 Colorado/Wyoming Baptist State Convention
 Western State Baptist Convention

Idaho

 Inter Mountain General Baptist Convention

Kansas

 Missionary Baptist State Convention of Kansas

Nebraska

 New Era Baptist State Convention of Nebraska, Inc.

New Mexico
 Mount Olive Missionary Baptist State Convention of New Mexico

Nevada
 Nevada-California Interstate Baptist Convention

Oklahoma
 Oklahoma Baptist State Convention
 Oklahoma Missionary Baptist State Convention

Utah
 Inter Mountain General Baptist Convention

Washington
 North Pacific Baptist State Convention

Wyoming
 Colorado/Wyoming Baptist State Convention

Outside continental US

Bahamas
 Bahamas National Baptist Missionary & Education Convention

References

External links
 National Baptist Convention, USA, Inc.
 Sunday School Publishing Board

Baptist denominations in North America
Denominational subdivisions in North America

de:National Baptist Convention, USA, Inc.